The women's Madison event at the 2020 Summer Olympics took place on 6 August 2021 at the Izu Velodrome. 30 cyclists (15 teams of 2) from 15 nations competed.

Background
This was the debut appearance of the women's event. The men's Madison was held from 2000 to 2008, then was dropped for 2012 and 2016 because there was no women's equivalent. The event returned in 2020 with a new women's counterpart.

The reigning (2020) world champions are Kirsten Wild and Amy Pieters of the Netherlands.

Russia, Germany, China, Great Britain, Australia, and the Netherlands are traditionally strong track cycling nations, while Belgium and France have strong pedigrees in Madison events.

Qualification

A National Olympic Committee (NOC) could enter up to 1 team of 2 cyclists in the madison. Quota places are allocated to the NOC, which selects the cyclists. Qualification is entirely through the 2018–20 UCI nation rankings. The 8 top nations in the team pursuit rankings automatically qualified a team in the Madison. The best 8 NOCs in the madison rankings (not already qualified through the team pursuit) also qualified to enter madison teams. The NOCs qualifying directly in the madison also earned 1 spot in the omnium. Because qualification was complete by the end of the 2020 UCI Track Cycling World Championships on 1 March 2020 (the last event that contributed to the 2018–20 rankings), qualification was unaffected by the COVID-19 pandemic.

Competition format
A madison race is a tag team points race that involves all 16 teams competing at once. One cyclist from each team competes at a time; the two team members can swap at any time by touching (including pushing and handslinging). The distance is 120 laps (30 km). Teams scores points in two ways: lapping the field and sprints. A team that gains a lap on the field earns 20 points; one that loses a lap has 20 points deducted. Every 10th lap is a sprint, with the first to finish the lap earning 5 points, second 3 points, third 2 points, and fourth 1 point. The points values are doubled for the final sprint. There is only one round of competition.

Schedule
All times are Japan Standard Time (UTC+9)

Results

The inaugural title was won in dominant fashion by Great Britain's Laura Kenny and Katie Archibald. Of 12 full sprints, Kenny and Archibald won ten, including the first three spins in a row, six sprints in a row mid race, and the double points sprint to conclude the race; scored in all twelve sprints, and took a lap on the field. Of the theoretically available 65 sprint points, they took 58 - no other team took more than 21.

By winning the inaugural women's madison, Laura Kenny completed a hat-trick of inaugural wins, having won (and then defended) the inaugural women's team pursuit and omnium titles in 2012. She also became the first female cyclist, or female British Olympian, to claim five gold medals, making her Great Britain's most successful female Olympian, and the most successful Olympic female cyclist, in history. This mirrored the achievements of her husband Jason Kenny who took the male versions of both these achievements with gold in men's keirin.

References

Women's Madison
Women's madison
Women's events at the 2020 Summer Olympics